Seely & Paget was the architectural partnership of John Seely, 2nd Baron Mottistone (1899–1963) and Paul Edward Paget (1901–1985).

Their work included the construction of Eltham Palace in the Art Deco style, and the post-World War II restoration of a number of bomb-damaged buildings, such as houses in the Little Cloister (Westminster Abbey), the London Charterhouse and the church of St John Clerkenwell.

Early lives and meeting 
John Seely, son of John Seely, 1st Baron Mottistone, and Paul Paget, son of Bishop Henry Luke Paget, met at Cambridge University, where Seely studied architecture, though Paget did not.

Beginnings as architects 

After graduating, Paget worked for a while as a bank clerk in the City of London while Seely remained at Cambridge. When Seely came down from Cambridge, he insisted that Paget join him in architectural practice, even though Paget had no architectural training. In the partnership, Paget concentrated on working with clients on their requirements, while Seely carried out the design work.

The first work of the two together was to remodel Mottistone Manor, a historic property belonging to Seely's father a National Trust property in the village of Mottistone on the Isle of Wight. Seely's father insisted on their plans being approved by Sir Edwin Lutyens. In the garden they built "The Shack", a tiny house intended as their country office and retreat.

Seely & Paget 

In 1922, the two founded the architectural firm of Seely & Paget.

According to Paget, "it was just the marriage of two minds... we became virtually one person". They were inseparable in business and life, and referred to each other as "the partner".

From 1930 they lived and worked together at 41 Cloth Fair, London, where the firm remained until 1986.

Early domestic works by the partnership were for the actress and theatre manager Gladys Cooper and the novelist and playwright J. B. Priestly at his home, 3, The Grove, Highgate, in London.

In 1936 Seely & Paget transformed Eltham Palace, a medieval palace, into an Art Deco mansion for Stephen Courtauld and Virginia Courtauld, who took a 99-year lease on the palace from the Crown.

After the Second World War Seely & Paget designed St Andrew and St George Stevenage, the largest parish church built in England since 1945. Other new churches they designed included St Faith Lee-on-the-Solent. and St Michael and St George, White City, London.

In 1959–60 they restored All Saints Church at Cottesbrooke. Among other buildings the partnership restored after war damage were Lambeth Palace, Eton College, Fulham Palace, London Charterhouse, St Mary Islington, St John Clerkenwell, and many other London churches.

End of the partnership 

Seely died on 18 January 1963 and was buried in St Catherine's chapel garden at Westminster Abbey.

Paget succeeded Seely as Surveyor of the Fabric of St Paul's Cathedral, in which role he supervised the cleaning of the cathedral and the reconstruction of the tower of St Augustine Watling Street. However, he completed little further architectural work, and in 1971, aged 70, he married children's writer Verily Anderson and retired with her and her children to Templewood in Norfolk (a house originally designed by the partners for Paget's uncle), where he lived until his death in 1985.

References

20th-century English architects
Architecture firms based in London
1922 establishments in England